Cope's eastern Paraguay tree frog (Boana polytaenia)  is a species of frog in the family Hylidae endemic to Brazil. Its natural habitats are subtropical or tropical moist lowland forests, subtropical or tropical moist montane forests, rivers, intermittent rivers, freshwater marshes, intermittent freshwater marshes, arable land, pastureland, plantations, rural gardens, urban areas, heavily degraded former forests, ponds, irrigated land, and canals and ditches.

References

Boana
Endemic fauna of Brazil
Amphibians described in 1870
Taxonomy articles created by Polbot